Erin Elizabeth Stewart (born May 4, 1987) is an American politician and the 40th Mayor of New Britain, Connecticut. Stewart is the daughter of former Mayor of New Britain Tim Stewart, who served from 2003 to 2011. She was elected to her first term on November 5, 2013, at the age of 26, to become the youngest mayor in New Britain's history and the city's second female mayor. Stewart was reelected to a second term on November 3, 2015, and a third term on November 7, 2017.

Stewart has been considered a rising star in the Connecticut Republican Party. In March 2018, after much speculation, she entered the race for Governor of Connecticut. However, her late entry caused problems with fundraising and accumulating delegate support, so she switched her campaign to one for lieutenant governor. She then lost the Republican primary for that race on August 14, coming in second against State Senator Joe Markley.

Early career 
Stewart's political career began as a campaign staffer for former Congresswoman Nancy Johnson. Working alongside Congresswoman Johnson, Stewart worked directly with municipal political leaders for various candidates around the State of Connecticut and to develop campaign strategy. Stewart interned for Governor Jodi Rell's Administration in the Office of Policy and Management, then in the Legislative Affairs Office. Before becoming mayor, Stewart worked as a legislative aide in the Connecticut General Assembly. Stewart was responsible for working on constituent problems for Kevin C. Kelly's state senate district of 100,000 residents and providing research to the senator on state laws. While working at the Connecticut General Assembly, she was elected member of the city's Board of Education.

Education 
Stewart graduated from New Britain High School in 2005.  She attended Central Connecticut State University, earning her Bachelor of Arts in Political Science, with a specialization in Public Administration and a minor in Communications, in 2009.

Volunteerism 
Stewart served as vice chairperson on the planning and budgeting subcommittee of New Britain's Commission on Community and Neighborhood Development.  She is also a Justice of the Peace.  Stewart has raised awareness about breast cancer due to the death of an aunt who died from the disease in 1998 at the age of 51. For the past several years, Stewart has served with Lt. Governor Nancy Wyman as the honorary co-chair of the Connecticut Race in the Park, a race held to raise funds and awareness for the Connecticut Breast Health Initiative.

Board of Education 
Elected to the Board of Education in November 2011, Stewart advocated for a return to neighborhood schools, greater parental engagement, and enhanced accountability measurements for teachers and administrators, while keeping costs down.  While Stewart served on the Board, the Board expanded Pre-K to all day programing. At that time, the Board of Education also decided to outfit the classrooms with SMART Board technology. After less than two years, Erin Stewart stepped down from the Board of Education to campaign for mayor.

Mayor of New Britain

Elections

2013 
On June 6, 2013, Stewart announced her intent to run for mayor. She was unopposed in the Republican primary. Stewart ran on a platform of government transparency and accountability while promising to restore financial health to the city in the face of a potential State takeover. On election day, Stewart beat the Democratic incumbent, Tim O'Brien, 56-44%.

2015 
During her 2015 campaign, Stewart received endorsements from the city's police and fire unions, along with Local 1186 of the American Federation of State, County and Municipal Employees, a union consisting of more than 300 city employees. Stewart was elected to a second term on November 3, 2015, after beating both Democratic candidate John McNamara and petitioning candidate Alfred Mayo, garnering more than sixty-six percent of the vote.  She became the first female elected New Britain mayor twice. Stewart's ticket, which was a "fusion ticket", consisted of registered Republicans, Democrats and Independents. For the first time in 44 years, the Common Council had a Republican majority, accounting for twelve of the fifteen seats on the Council.

2017 
On January 19, 2017, Stewart announced that she was seeking a third term. In her re-election campaign, Stewart stressed the importance of economic development and committed to completing the "Complete Streets Master Plan". Stewart was re-elected on November 7, 2017, by defeating Board of Education member Merrill Gay 57.5% - 42.5%, becoming the first female mayor of the city to win a third term.

2019 
On April 14, 2019, Mayor Stewart announced that she was seeking a fourth term. On November 5, 2019, she defeated Chris Porcher and secured another term.

2021 
On January 26, 2021, Mayor Stewart announced that she will seek a fifth term. On March 14, 2021 after much speculation she announced that she will not be a candidate for Governor in 2022. On November 2, 2021, Mayor Stewart won a historic fifth term to become the city's longest-serving Republican Mayor.

Tenure

Budget and finances 
During Stewart's tenure the city restored a structurally-balanced budget.  A $30 million deficit was corrected with $16 million in spending cuts, cuts of 30 full-time jobs, and an 11 percent increase in taxes, while adding $14.9 million to the rainy day fund. The fiscal policy resulted in 4 bond-rating upgrades from Standard & Poor's, three in January 2015, and one in January 2016.

Economic development 
Costco was added to the city's list of top ten taxpayers in the fall of 2015. 
Business interest has been sparked by the opening of CTfastrak, New England's first bus rapid transit system, which directly connects downtown New Britain with Connecticut's capital city of Hartford. Both the city and the state are spending millions in transit-oriented development and seven phases of streetscape improvements, which are bringing increased commercial and residential development to New Britain. Stewart secured more than $12 million in both state and federal grants to help pay for the Complete Streetscape Master Plan.

New Britain Bees 
New Britain has had a professional baseball team since 1983. In June 2014, the city's longtime baseball team, the New Britain Rock Cats announced that they were moving to Hartford. After the announcement former Bridgeport Mayor Bill Finch connected Stewart with Atlantic League of Professional Baseball, the owners of the Bridgeport Bluefish. After months of negotiations, Stewart received a commitment from the league to bring what would become the New Britain Bees to the city. Due to a lapse in contracts, New Britain was without baseball for one day.

Homelessness 
Stewart has invested resources into helping New Britain's homeless population through her creation of the Building Hope Together Task Force: New Britain's Permanent Workplan to End Homelessness. Stewart secured $2.145 million to fund the construction of more than ten units of permanent supportive housing; connecting individuals to the services needed to get back on their feet. Veterans' homelessness is another issue which Stewart has made a focal point of her tenure, providing access to services, supportive housing and critical care needed by veterans. Working closely with Veterans Inc., the City committed $205,000 to bring 18 units of veterans' housing to New Britain.

Energy and innovation 
Stewart committed to making New Britain a "green" community. Through her "Smart City Initiative," Stewart spearheaded the largest solarization project in New Britain's history, including a solar array at Shuttle Meadow Reservoir, as well as rooftop solar arrays on most school buildings. She is also taking steps to increase the use of LED technology in all City buildings and streetlights, to further reduce the City's energy consumption, and is embarking on building the city's first fuel cell. Stewart founded an Energy and Innovation Committee to oversee this initiative.

New media 
Stewart has a monthly television show called Around New Britain with Mayor Stewart that airs on Nutmeg Television. It is also available on YouTube. In 2016,  Stewart presented the first ever digital State of the City as way of transforming City Hall.

Political positions 
Mayor Erin Stewart is a moderate Republican; she is a "self-described fiscal conservative who is moderate to liberal on social issues". During her tenure as mayor, she reduced the number of city employees and moderately raised taxes. Stewart proposed a 2018 budget for New Britain that did not raise taxes and did not increase school spending.

Stewart is pro-choice on the issue of abortion and supports gun ownership and is a gun owner herself. She supports same-sex marriage.

Awards and accolades 
Stewart has received awards for her political service:
 2016: Central Connecticut State University – Women of Influence Award
 2015: Central Connecticut State University – Young Alumni Service Award
 2015: Connecticut Coalition Against Domestic Violence honored her with "First 100 Plus"
 2014: New Britain City Journal's "Person of the Year"
 2014: Connecticut Magazine honorary, "Top 40 under 40"
 2013: Women in Leadership award from the Connecticut Republican Party. 
  2007: Greater New Britain YWCA's Women in Leadership award for her work with the CT Breast Health Initiative.
Mayor Stewart has been the subject of in-depth profiles by national media outlets such as The New York Times.

Personal life 
Stewart was born May 4, 1987, in New Britain to Patricia (Badolato) and Timothy Stewart. Her uncle, Dominic J. Badolato, was first elected to the Connecticut General Assembly in 1954, and served for 22 years, and her father, Mayor Timothy Stewart, served as mayor of New Britain from 2003-2011. In 2018, she married Dominic Mutone. They have a daughter, Lina Elizabeth, born July 26, 2020.

References

External links 
New Britain official government website
Erin Stewart's official campaign website

1987 births
Central Connecticut State University alumni
Living people
Mayors of New Britain, Connecticut
Connecticut Republicans
Women mayors of places in Connecticut
21st-century American women